Matthew McGuire may refer to:

 Matthew Francis McGuire (1898–1986), a United States federal judge
 Matthew McGuire, member of the band The Exploited
 Matthew "Matt" McGuire (played by Jake Thomas), the fictional little brother of Lizzie McGuire